Aerenea is a genus of longhorn beetles of the subfamily Lamiinae.

Species
A. aglaia Monné, 1980
A. albilarvata Bates, 1866
A. alvaradoi Prosen, 1947
A. annulata Monné, 1980
A. antennalis Breuning, 1948
A. apicalis Melzer, 1923
A. batesi Monné, 1980
A. bimaculata (Brèthes, 1920)
A. brunnea Thomson, 1868
A. ecuadoriensis Breuning, 1947
A. flavofasciculata Breuning, 1948
A. flavolineata Melzer, 1923
A. gounellei Monné, 1980
A. humerolineata Breuning, 1980
A. impetiginosa Thomson, 1868
A. occulta Monné, 1980
A. panamensis Martins & Galileo, 2010
A. periscelifera Thomson, 1868
A. posticalis Thomson, 1857
A. punctatostriata (Breuning, 1948)
A. quadriplagiata (Boheman, 1859)
A. robusta Monné, 1980
A. setifera Thomson, 1868
A. subcostata Melzer, 1932
A. subimpetiginosa Breuning, 1948
A. sulcicollis Melzer, 1932
A. transversefasciata Breuning, 1974
A. trigona Pascoe, 1858
A. tuberculata Monné, 1980

References

Compsosomatini
Cerambycidae genera